The Little Red Hen is an American fable first collected by Mary Mapes Dodge in St. Nicholas Magazine in 1874. The story is meant to teach children the importance of hard work and personal initiative.

The story
A hen living on a farm finds some wheat and decides to make bread with it. She asks the other farmyard animals to help her plant it, but they refuse. The hen then harvests and mills the wheat into flour before baking it into bread; at each stage she again asks the animals for help and they refuse. Finally, with her task complete, the hen asks who will help her eat the bread. This time the animals accept eagerly, but the hen refuses them stating that no one helped her with her work and decides to eat the bread herself. She then runs away with it.

Background and adaptations
The tale is based on a story Dodge's mother often told her. Originally the other animals besides the hen consist of a rat, a cow, a cat, a dog, a duck, and a pig. Later adaptations often reduce the number of other animals to three.

The story was likely intended as a literature primer for young readers, but departed from highly moralistic, often religious stories written for the same purpose. Adaptations throughout the 1880s incorporated appealing illustrations in order to hold the reader's attention as interest became more relevant to reading lessons. Repetitive vocabulary is still used in adaptations in order to encourage learning for very early readers. A 2006 picture book adaptation by Jerry Pinkney was well-received for similar reasons.

An animated adaptation of the story titled The Wise Little Hen was produced by Walt Disney Productions in 1934. It is notable for the first appearance of Donald Duck as one of the lazy animals who refuses to help the hen.

Revisions
Politically themed revisions of the story include a conservative version based on a 1976 monologue from Ronald Reagan. This version features a farmer who claims that the hen is being unfair by refusing to share the bread and forcing her to do so, removing the hen's incentive to work and causing poverty to befall the farm. Another version satirizes capitalism by depicting the hen promising the animals slices of bread if they make it, but keeping the largest slice for herself despite not doing any work. A version by Malvina Reynolds adapts the story into a pro-work socialist anthem as the hen retains the fruits of her labor, saying "And that's why they called her Red". In some versions it's her children who help her and after she refuses to share with the other animals they promise to help from now on.

An episode of the animated series Super Why! features a revision of the story. In the episode, the Super Readers change the ending so that the hen tells the animals why she needs their help and they listen, enabling them to help her finish the cornbread so that she shares it with them.

See also
 The Ant and the Grasshopper, an Aesop fable with a similar moral
 The Gigantic Turnip

References

External links

 The Little Red Hen: An Old English Folk Tale (HTML version), Retold and Illustrated by Florence White Williams, Saalfield Publishing Company, 1918, available from Project Gutenberg

Fables
Animal tales
Works of unknown authorship
Fictional chickens
Little Golden Books
American picture books
Literary characters introduced in 1874